The 2016 season was the Cleveland Browns' 64th in the National Football League (NFL), their 68th overall, and their first under head coach Hue Jackson and de facto general manager Sashi Brown. The Browns failed to improve upon their 3–13 record from their previous season, finishing 1–15, their worst record in franchise history at the time. The Browns failed to make the playoffs for a franchise-record 14th straight season and ninth straight season with a losing record.

Despite the team's performance, offensive tackle Joe Thomas became the fifth player in league history to be selected to the Pro Bowl in each of his first 10 seasons.

Offseason

Front office changes
On January 3, just hours after the Browns' final game of the 2015 season, the team fired general manager Ray Farmer, who had been the general manager the past two seasons. Team owner Jimmy Haslam also announced that the team's general counsel Sashi Brown would become the team's vice president of football operations.

On January 5, the Browns hired former New York Mets executive Paul DePodesta to be their chief strategy officer. DePodesta brought over 20 years of experience in the Major League Baseball front offices, but had never held an executive position in the NFL before this.

On March 4, the Browns announced the resignation of team president Alec Scheiner, effective March 31.

Coaching changes
On January 3, the Browns fired head coach Mike Pettine. In two seasons with the Browns, Pettine had a record of 10–22, but went just 4–19 after a 6–3 start to the 2014 season.

On January 13, the Browns hired former Cincinnati Bengals offensive coordinator Hue Jackson as head coach. Jackson was the Bengals' offensive coordinator for the past two seasons and was the head coach of the Oakland Raiders in 2011, in which they posted an 8–8 record.

Roster changes

Free agents

Releases

Signings

2016 Draft Class

Notes
 The Browns traded their original 1st round selection (No. 2) to the Philadelphia Eagles for the Eagles' 1st (8), 3rd (77), and 4th (100) round selections, as well as the Eagles' 1st round selection in 2017 and 2nd round selection in 2018.
The Browns would then trade the No. 8 and its 6th round (176) selection to the Tennessee Titans for their 1st (15) and 3rd (76) round selections and a 2nd round selection in 2017.
 The Browns traded their 3rd (No. 77) and 5th (141) round selections to the Carolina Panthers for their 3rd (93), 4th (129), and 5th (168) round selections.
 The Browns traded their 4th round selection (No. 100) to the Oakland Raiders for their 4th (114) and 5th (154) round selections.
 The Browns traded their 7th round selection (No. 223) to the Miami Dolphins for their 7th round selection (250) and CB Jamar Taylor.
 ^As the result of a negative differential of free agent signings and departures that the Browns experienced during the  free agency period, the team received three compensatory selections for the 2016 draft: selection 138 in the fourth round, and selections 172 and 173 in the fifth round. Free agent transactions that occurred after May 12, 2015 did not impact the team's formula for determining compensatory selections for the 2016 draft.

Josh Gordon's reinstatement and rehab
On April 1, wide receiver Josh Gordon applied for reinstatement following an indefinite suspension by the NFL due to repeated violations of the league's substance abuse policy, causing him to miss the entire 2015 season. On April 11, it was revealed that Gordon had failed another drug test, and on April 12, the league announced that Gordon's appeal had been denied. He was eligible to reapply on August 1.

On July 25, the NFL announced that Gordon would be reinstated on a conditional basis, and can stay with the team during a four-game ban to begin the season.

Staff

Final roster

Preseason

Schedule

Regular season

Schedule

Note: Intra-division opponents are in bold text.

Game summaries

Week 1: at Philadelphia Eagles

The Browns opened their 2016 regular season with a road game against the Philadelphia Eagles and rookie quarterback Carson Wentz, whom the Browns had passed up in the 2016 draft. The Eagles won 29–10 and with the loss, the Browns started the season 0–1.  This would be their 12th straight regular season opening loss.

Week 2: vs. Baltimore Ravens

The Browns scored on their first three drives and led 20–2 early in the first quarter. The 18-point lead at the end of the first quarter was the Browns' largest lead after the 1st quarter since 1960. However, the Browns' offense stalled the rest of the game. The Ravens would score the final 23 points of the game to win 25–20. The Browns had a chance to score a go-ahead touchdown on a drive with less than a minute to play, but things went wrong after a controversial taunting penalty was called on Pryor following his catch at the Ravens' 10-yard line with under 30 seconds to play. McCown would throw an interception on the next play to seal the loss.

With the loss, the Browns fell to 0–2.

Week 3: at Miami Dolphins

Cody Kessler made his debut as the Browns' starting quarterback. The Browns led 13–10 at halftime. However, the Dolphins scored two consecutive touchdowns to go up 24–13 early in the fourth quarter. The Browns, sparked by Pryor, rallied to tie the game. The Dolphins attempted a game-winning drive in the final minute of regulation. However, Dolphins QB, Ryan Tannehill, fumbled the ball, and the Browns secured possession. The Browns had a chance to win it at the end of regulation. However, recently signed Browns kicker, Cody Parkey, missed the 46-yard field goal, sending the game to overtime. It was his third miss of the day. Both teams traded punts on their opening possession in overtime. On their second possession, the Dolphins, who got the ball around midfield to start the drive, reached the endzone after a few plays and won the game.

With the loss, the Browns fell to 0–3.

Week 4: at Washington Redskins

The Browns came to Washington for a matchup against the Redskins. The Browns had a 20–17 lead going into the fourth quarter but the offense once again stalled with a Josh Norman interception and two touchdowns by the Redskins' offense would win the game for the Redskins.

With the loss, the Browns started their season 0–4 for the first time since 2012. Wins by the Jaguars, Bears, and Saints would make the Browns the only team in the NFL without a victory through Week 4.

Week 5: vs. New England Patriots

With Tom Brady back from his four-game suspension due to his alleged role in Deflategate, the Browns hosted the Patriots. The game turned out to be a disaster for the Browns as Brady and the Pats destroyed the Browns defense.

The loss dropped the Browns to 0–5.

Week 6: at Tennessee Titans

With the loss, the Browns dropped to 0–6 and became the first NFL team to start 0–6 since the Oakland Raiders in 2014. It was the Browns' first 0–6 start since the 1999 season.

Week 7: at Cincinnati Bengals

With their fourth straight loss to the Bengals, the Browns started 0–7 for the first time since 1999.

Week 8: vs. New York Jets

Hoping to stop a 10-game losing streak dating back to last year, the Browns hosted the Jets in an AFC duel. The Browns led 20–7 at halftime. However, they gave up 24 unanswered points to fall behind 31–20 in the 4th quarter. They also committed two turnovers in the 4th quarter. The Browns scored late in the 4th quarter to cut the deficit to 31–28, but a comeback could not be secured as the Jets secured the onside kick, ran out the clock, and dropped the Browns to 0–8. It was only their second 0–8 start in franchise history and the first 0–8 start since the 1975 season. With the loss, the Browns failed to have a winning record for the ninth consecutive season. They also tied a franchise record (first set in between the 2011 and 2012 seasons) for most consecutive losses (11) in franchise history. They would also be the first team to start 0–8 since the 2014 Raiders.

Week 9: vs. Dallas Cowboys

Attempting to stop their 11-game losing streak, the Cleveland Browns hosted the Dallas Cowboys. The Cowboys routed the Browns 35–10.

With the loss, the Browns dropped to 0–9 for the first time since 1975 and clinched their ninth consecutive losing season. They also lost their 12th consecutive game, setting a new franchise record for most consecutive losses.

Week 10: at Baltimore Ravens

Trying to halt their 12-game losing streak that had started back during the 2015 NFL season, the Browns traveled to Baltimore to play against the Baltimore Ravens who beat them in Week 2. This was the Browns' only prime time game this year. The Browns led 7–6 at halftime, but the Ravens dominated the second half, outscoring them 22–0 and winning 28–7. The seven points scored by the Browns represented their fewest points scored in a game this season.

With the loss, the Browns fell to 0–10. It was their worst start in franchise history. They are also the first team to begin the season 0–10 since the 2014 Oakland Raiders.  The Browns' overall NFL record fell to 461–461–10, marking the first time in franchise history they did not have a record above .500.

Week 11: vs. Pittsburgh Steelers

The Browns hosted the Pittsburgh Steelers, who were coming off a loss against the Cowboys. The Steelers defeated the Browns 24–9, dropping the Browns to 0–11. With the loss, the Browns were mathematically eliminated from postseason contention for the 14th consecutive season. For the second consecutive season, they were the first NFL team to be mathematically eliminated from contention. The Browns have now gone 24 consecutive seasons without winning a division title, extending the longest active streak in the NFL. They also extended their current franchise record for most consecutive games lost to 14 games. The team is also the first team to start 0–11 since the 2011 Indianapolis Colts.

Week 12: vs. New York Giants

The Browns took on the Giants who were on a five-game winning streak and were coming off their 22–16 win over the Bears, but the Browns suffered their 12th straight loss this season due to three touchdown passes by Eli Manning to Odell Beckham Jr. and a fumble return by Jason Pierre-Paul for a touchdown.

With the loss, the Browns went into their bye week at 0–12. They would be the first team to start with such a record since the 2011 Colts.

Week 14: vs. Cincinnati Bengals

Coming off their bye week, the Browns hosted the Bengals in a rematch of Week 7. The Bengals jumped out to a 20–0 halftime lead and never looked back, handing Cleveland a 23–10 loss.

With the loss, Cleveland became the eighth team since 1960 to start a season 0–13, and the first since the 2011 Indianapolis Colts. They became the first franchise to lose 16 in a row since the Oakland Raiders did it during the 2013 and 2014 seasons.

Week 15: at Buffalo Bills

The Browns headed to Buffalo to try to collect their first win of the season, but the Bills routed the Browns 33–13. With the loss, the Browns fell to 0–14 and became the first team to lose 17 consecutive regular season games since the St. Louis Rams in the 2008 and 2009 seasons.  The Browns also became the fourth team to start a season 0–14, joining the 1976 Tampa Bay Buccaneers, 1980 New Orleans Saints, and the 2008 Detroit Lions.  The Browns also tied their franchise record for total losses in a single season.  The Browns also became the first team since the 2013 Houston Texans to have 14 straight losses in a single season.

On December 21, OT Joe Thomas was voted to his 10th consecutive Pro Bowl. Thomas now holds the Browns record for most Pro Bowls, passing Pro Football Hall of Famers Jim Brown and Lou Groza, who each have nine. Thomas joins Pro Football Hall of Famers Merlin Olsen (14), Mel Renfro (10), Barry Sanders (10) and Lawrence Taylor (10) as the only players in NFL history to make the Pro Bowl in each of their first 10 seasons. Thomas' streak of 10 consecutive Pro Bowls was the longest active streak in the NFL.

Week 16: vs. San Diego Chargers

In their final home game of the year, the Browns hosted the San Diego Chargers on Christmas Eve afternoon, looking to get their first win. The contest was competitive throughout the afternoon. The Chargers had a game-tying field goal attempt blocked by Jamie Meder with just under 4 minutes to go in the fourth quarter. After the Browns punted, the Chargers drove down the field and reached the Browns’ 27-yard line in the final seconds. However, the Chargers had no timeouts remaining and had to rush the field goal unit out in the final seconds. Kicker Josh Lambo missed the potential game-tying field goal as time expired, allowing the Browns to pick up their first win of the season.

With the win, the Browns improved to 1–14 and ended their 17-game losing streak.  The Browns finished the season 1–7 at home.  This was the first and only time this season that the Browns allowed fewer than 23 points in a single game. After this game, the Browns would have a 19-game winless streak and would not win again until week 3 of the 2018 season.

Week 17: at Pittsburgh Steelers

The Browns entered this game looking to win consecutive games for the first time since they won three in a row during Weeks 8 to 10 of the 2014 season. The Steelers entered the game locked into the AFC's #3 seed and rested most of their starters.  However, the Browns would still fall to the Steelers, losing 27–24 in an overtime affair. With the loss, the Browns finished the season with a 1–15 record, their worst record in franchise history.  The Browns also became the tenth team in NFL history, but the first since the 2009 Rams, to finish 1–15. They failed to win a division game for the first time since the 2011 season and extended their losing streak within the division to 11 games. The Browns also failed to win a road game in a season for only the second time in franchise history and the first since the 1975 season. They also extended their road losing streak to 13 games and failed to win a road game against the Steelers for the 13th consecutive season.  The Browns finished with the worst record in the NFL and secured the #1 overall pick in the 2017 NFL Draft. This marked the beginning of a 17-game losing streak continuing through the 2017 season and ending with a tie in Week 1 of the 2018 season.

Standings

Division

Conference

References

External links

   
 2016 Cleveland Browns at Pro Football Reference (Profootballreference.com)
 2016 Cleveland Browns Statistics at jt-sw.com
 2016 Cleveland Browns Schedule at jt-sw.com
 2016 Cleveland Browns at DatabaseFootball.com  

Cleveland
Cleveland Browns seasons
Cleveland Browns